George Frederick Richardson (1837 – 23 October 1909), sometimes published as George Francis Richardson, was a 19th-century Member of Parliament in Southland, New Zealand and a cabinet minister.

Biography

Richardson was born in Cheltenham, England, and came to New Zealand in 1851 on the ship Dominion. He moved to Dunedin, where he qualified as a surveyor. In 1867 he married Augusta Marie Isabella Paterson White, daughter of Invercargill merchant Thomas John White; they had three daughters and two sons.

He represented the Mataura electorate from 1884 to 1893 when he was defeated, and from 1896 to 1898 when he was adjudged bankrupt.

He was Minister of Lands (8 October 1887 – 24 January 1891), Minister of Mines (8 October 1887 – 17 October 1889), Minister of Immigration (8 October 1887 – 24 January 1891) and Minister of Agriculture (17 October 1889 – 24 January 1891) in the 5th Atkinson Ministry.

In 1891 he was granted the right to retain the title of "Honourable". He died at his residence in Tinakori Road, Wellington on 23 October 1909, and was buried at Karori Cemetery.

Notes

References

1837 births
1909 deaths
People from Cheltenham
English emigrants to New Zealand
Members of the Cabinet of New Zealand
Members of the New Zealand House of Representatives
New Zealand MPs for South Island electorates
Independent MPs of New Zealand
Unsuccessful candidates in the 1893 New Zealand general election
Burials at Karori Cemetery
19th-century New Zealand politicians